Abhinivesham is a 1977 Indian Malayalam film, directed by I. V. Sasi and produced by C. C. Baby and V. M. Chandi. The film stars Padmapriya, Ravikumar, Sumithra and Jayan in the lead roles. The film has musical score by Shyam. The film was a remake of Tamil film Uravu Solla Oruvan (1975).

Plot
Sathi strongly wishes to marry a wealthy man and rejects Babu due to his poverty. Later when she finds that her options are limited, decides to turn Babu into a rich suitor.

Cast

Padmapriya as Sathi
Soman as Venu
Ravikumar as Babu
Sumithra as Sindhu
Jayan as Gopinath
Sukumari as Doctor
Jose Prakash as Mr. Menon
T. R. Omana as Devaki
Baby Bindu as Rajini
Bahadoor as Rajan
Chachappan
M. G. Soman as Venu
Meena as Saraswathy
Treesa

Soundtrack
The music was composed by Shyam and the lyrics were written by Sreekumaran Thampi.

References

External links
 
 view the film abinivesham 1977

1977 films
1970s Malayalam-language films
Films directed by I. V. Sasi
Malayalam remakes of Tamil films